Gyrosteus is an extinct genus of very large ray-finned fish belonging to the family Chondrosteidae. It comprises the type species, 
Gyrosteus mirabilis, which lived during the early Toarcian (Late Early Jurassic) in what is now northern Europe. A possible second species, "Gyrosteus" subdeltoideus, is known from otoliths. 

Fossil remains of G. mirabilis have been recovered from the Whitby Mudstone Formation, United Kingdom, and from Ahrensburg erratics assemblage in Schleswig-Holstein, northern Germany. It was mentioned but not formally described in subsequent publications and was left as a nomen nudum for more than 25 years. Then in 1889 it was featured and formally described by Arthur Smith Woodward. Gyrosteus was thought to be exclusive of the “British faunal province” and separated from the “Germanic faunal province” until the discovery of a hyomandibula in the baltic realm, mostly populated by Germanic fauna, which possibly implicates that Baltic region represented an interdigitating zone between both regions.

References

Prehistoric ray-finned fish genera
Jurassic bony fish
Jurassic fish of Europe
Fossil taxa described in 1843